David E. Hynes (born April 17, 1951) is an American former professional ice hockey player who played 22 games in the National Hockey League for the Boston Bruins in 1973–75 as well as 22 games in the World Hockey Association for the New England Whalers in 1976–77. He was also a member of the United States national team at the 1972, 1973 and 1977 Ice Hockey World Championship tournaments. He was born in Cambridge, Massachusetts. As a youth, he played in the 1963 Quebec International Pee-Wee Hockey Tournament with his Boston minor ice hockey team. Hynes has the distinction of being the first American born player to be drafted by the Boston Bruins. He was selected in the fourth round, 56th overall, by the Bruins in the 1971 NHL Amateur Draft.

Career statistics

Regular season and playoffs

International

Awards and honors

References

External links

Dave Hynes @ Hockeydraftcentral.com

1951 births
Living people
AHCA Division I men's ice hockey All-Americans
American men's ice hockey forwards
Boston Braves (AHL) players
Boston Bruins draft picks
Boston Bruins players
Harvard Crimson men's ice hockey players
Ice hockey players from Massachusetts
New England Whalers players
Rhode Island Reds players
Rochester Americans players
Sportspeople from Cambridge, Massachusetts
Springfield Indians players